The Queen's Award for Enterprise: International Trade (Export) (2003) was awarded on 21 April 2003, by Queen Elizabeth II.

Recipients
The following organisations were awarded this year.
ALSTOM Power Ltd Technology Centre of Whetstone, Leicester for Engineering design, test and manufacture of turbines.
AMEC Group Limited of Northwich, Cheshire for Specialised engineering services.
Aston Martin Lagonda Limited of Newport Pagnell, Buckinghamshire for Prestigious sports cars, parts and restoration services.
W Ball & Son Ltd t/a Baltex of Ilkeston, Derbyshire for Warp-knitted textiles.
Beautimatic International Ltd of Witham, Essex for Perfumes and body sprays.
Biocatalysts Ltd of Pontypridd, Wales for Enzymes for use in food processing.
Business Planning and Research Limited t/a BPRI of London SE1 for Market research based consultancy services.
Clearwater Hampers of Wantage, Oxfordshire for Food and drink hampers.
Crystalox Limited of Wantage, Oxfordshire for Multicrystalline silicon products for the photovoltaic industry.
Cyton Biosciences Ltd of Clifton, Bristol for Business consultancy services.
Dando Drilling International Limited of Littlehampton, West Sussex for Drilling rigs and equipment.
Dedicated Microcomputers Group Ltd of Swinton, Salford for Digital video multiplex recorders designed to record and manage live images from CCTV systems.
Diamonite Aircraft Furnishings Ltd of Bristol for Complete aircraft interiors.
Alan Dick & Company Limited of Cheltenham, Gloucestershire for Integrated radio infrastructure services and products for cellular, broadcast, civilian and military communications.
e2v technologies Imaging Business Group of Chelmsford, Essex for Intra-oral dental CCD (charge-coupled device) assemblies.
e2v technologies Therapy Business Group of Chelmsford, Essex for Linear accelerator magnetrons.
EOC UK Limited of Trafford Park, Manchester for Latex compounds.
Easypack Limited of Welwyn Garden City, Hertfordshire for Cushion packaging systems.
Excell Biotech Ltd of Oakbank, Livingston, Scotland for Process development and cGMP manufacture of biopharmaceuticals for early stage clinical trials.
Fresh Catch Ltd of Peterhead, Aberdeenshire, Scotland for Mackerel, herring and whitefish products.
HCA International Limited of London W2 for Private healthcare.
Hayles & Howe Ltd of Bristol for Ornamental plasterwork and scagliola.
Hibreeds International Limited of Norwich, Norfolk for Poultry hatching eggs.
History & Heraldry Ltd of Rotherham for Impulse-buy gifts and greeting cards.
ID Business Solutions Limited t/a IDBS of Guildford, Surrey for Software for life sciences research.
IPA Energy Consulting Ltd of Edinburgh, Scotland for Design, implementation and support of regulatory frameworks and markets in the electricity and gas sectors.
W. Jordan (Cereals) Ltd of Biggleswade, Bedfordshire for Breakfast cereals and cereal bars.
J. Marr (Seafoods) Limited of Hessle, East Yorkshire for Frozen pelagic fish.
Maviga Limited of Yalding, Maidstone, Kent for Dried edible pulses and other special crops.
Meridian Medical Technologies Limited of Belfast, Northern Ireland for Medical diagnostic and monitoring devices.
Middlesex University of London N14 for Higher education at undergraduate and postgraduate levels, research and knowledge transfer.
Neat Concepts Limited of London N18 for Flexible medium density fibreboard.
Neomedic Limited of Northwood, Middlesex for Medical disposables.
No Climb Products Limited of Barnet, Hertfordshire for Test and maintenance products for fire detection systems.
Omitec Group Limited of Devizes, Wiltshire for Automotive test equipment and support services.
ORION Clinical Services Limited of Slough, Berkshire for Services in support of drug development for the pharmaceutical and biotechnology sectors.
Oxford Instruments Plasma Technology Ltd of Yatton, Bristol for Plasma processing and ion beam etching and deposition equipment.
Passion For Life Healthcare Limited of Epsom, Surrey for Healthcare products.
Penn Pharmaceutical Services Ltd of Tredegar, Gwent, Wales for Pharmaceutical development and manufacturing services to the international healthcare industry.
PerkinElmer (U.K.) Ltd, Optoelectronics Division of Wokingham, Berkshire for Fibre optic test instrumentation.
Pfizer Limited of Sandwich, Kent for Research, development and manufacture of pharmaceutical products.
Photonic Products Limited of Bishops Stortford, Hertfordshire for Laser diodes and opto-electronic sub-assemblies.
Precision Antennas Ltd of Stratford-upon-Avon, Warwickshire for Microwave and satellite antennas.
Rolls-Royce Airlines - Trent Business of Derby for The Trent family of aero engines.
The Royal Bank of Scotland Group plc of Edinburgh, Scotland for Financial services.
SHS International Ltd of Liverpool, Merseyside for Specialized clinical nutrition products.
STG Aerospace Limited of SwaVham, Norfolk for Photoluminescent emergency floorpath marking systems for aircraft.
Seabait Limited of Ashington, Northumberland for Marine worms.
Simmons & Simmons of London EC2 for Legal services.
The Somerset Toiletry Company Ltd of Clutton, Bristol for Toiletries including soaps, drawer liners, candles, room fragrances and skincare.
Stage Technologies Ltd of London N5 for Theatre automation systems.
State Street Global Advisors Limited of London SW1 for Investment management.
Static Control Components (Europe) Ltd of Reading, Berkshire for Components for the re-manufacture of laser cartridges.
The Television Corporation plc of London W1 for International production and distribution of television programmes and the supply of complete technical facilities to broadcasters.
Trinity International Services Ltd of Aberdeen, Scotland for OVshore and remote-site catering and hotel-keeping services.
TTPCom Ltd of Royston, Hertfordshire for Software and hardware designs for mobile devices.
Turner & Townsend International Ltd of Horsforth, Leeds for Construction and management consultancy services.
Ultra Electronics Precision Air Systems of Gloucester for Miniature high pressure air compressor systems.
Univation Limited of Aberdeen, Scotland for Training and consultancy services to industry.
Vitabiotics Ltd of Wembley, Middlesex for Vitamin supplements and nutraceuticals for specific therapeutic areas, including Omega-H3, Osteocare and Pregnacare.
Worth Global Style Network Ltd of London W2 for Research and analysis for the fashion and style industries.
Zeus Aluminium Products Ltd of Dudley, West Midlands for Light-weight aluminium precision sand castings.

References

Queen's Award for Enterprise: International Trade (Export)
2003 in the United Kingdom